Dower Lake is a lake in Todd County, in the U.S. state of Minnesota.

Dower Lake was named for Sampson Dower, an English settler.

See also
List of lakes in Minnesota

References

Lakes of Minnesota
Lakes of Todd County, Minnesota